Fiona "Feepo" Pocock  is an English female rugby union player. She represented  at the 2010 Women's Rugby World Cup. Pocock missed out on the final after sustaining an injury in the semi-finals match against .

As of 2012 she coaches the East London Women’s RFC team. Pocock returned to play for England in 2015. By 2017 she had made 32 appearances for England.

Pocock attended Churcher's College.

References

External links
Player Profile

1989 births
Living people
England women's international rugby union players
English female rugby union players
Female rugby union players
Rugby union players from Northampton